Correbidia is a genus of moths in the subfamily Arctiinae. The genus was erected by George Hampson in 1898.

Species
Correbidia assimilis Rothschild, 1912
Correbidia calopteridia (Butler, 1878)
Correbidia costinotata Schaus, 1911
Correbidia elegans (Druce, 1884)
Correbidia joinvillea Schaus, 1921
Correbidia notata (Butler, 1878)
Correbidia simonsi Rothschild, 1912
Correbidia striata (Druce, 1884)
Correbidia terminalis (Walker, 1856)

References

External links

Arctiinae